The 2018 OEC Kaohsiung was a professional tennis tournament played on hard courts. It was the seventh edition of the tournament which was part of the 2018 ATP Challenger Tour. It took place in Kaohsiung, Taiwan between 17 and 23 September 2018.

Singles main-draw entrants

Seeds

 1 Rankings are as of 10 September 2018.

Other entrants
The following players received wildcards into the singles main draw:
  Ernests Gulbis
  Gaël Monfils
  Tseng Chun-hsin
  Wu Tung-lin

The following players received entry into the singles main draw as special exempts:
  Blaž Kavčič
  Li Zhe

The following players received entry from the qualifying draw:
  Chung Yun-seong
  Frederico Ferreira Silva
  Kwon Soon-woo
  Akira Santillan

The following player received entry as a lucky loser:
  Yūichi Sugita

Champions

Singles

 Gaël Monfils def.  Kwon Soon-woo 6–4, 2–6, 6–1.

Doubles

 Hsieh Cheng-peng /  Yang Tsung-hua def.  Hsu Yu-hsiou /  Jimmy Wang 6–7(3–7), 6–2, [10–8].

References

2018
2018 ATP Challenger Tour
2018 in Taiwanese tennis